Société le suffrage des femmes also known as Société le droit des femmes or (SFF), was a women's organization in France, founded in 1876.  

Its purpose was to work for the introduction of women's suffrage. It was the first organisation in France founded exclusively to work for women's suffrage, founded prior to the Ligue Française pour le Droit des Femmes (1882).

SFF was founded by Hubertine Auclert. It used radical and militant methods and was supported by radical liberals and socialists, but it was a small organisation with little support among the general public.

References 

Feminist organizations in France
1876 establishments in France
1919 disestablishments in France
Political organizations based in France
Women's suffrage in France
Organizations established in 1876
Organizations disestablished in 1919
Voter rights and suffrage organizations
1876 in women's history